Tucker Field at Barcroft Park is a baseball venue located in Arlington, Virginia, US.  The field is home to the George Washington Colonials baseball team of the NCAA Division I Atlantic 10 Conference.  The field holds a capacity of 500 spectators.  The field is officially designated Tucker Field at Barcroft Park Field #6 and includes a new turf field laid in 2019 by FieldTurf, bullpens, enclosed dugouts, bleachers, lights, scoreboard, and pressbox.

Renovations

In the offseason between 2011 and 2012, Barcroft Park underwent renovations.  Using funds from both George Washington University and the Arlington County Parks, Recreation, and Cultural Resources Department, the field will receive a new artificial turf surface, a press box, stadium seating, concessions, dugouts, and bullpens.  In December 2011, the demolition of the previous structures was completed.  At the beginning of the 2012 season, the renovations had not been completed, and George Washington was forced to relocate some home games.  George Washington played its first game at the renovated park on March 23, 2012, in which the Colonials lost to La Salle 7–4.

Colonials home records
The following is a list of Colonials home records since the team began playing at Barcroft in the 1993 season.

See also
 List of NCAA Division I baseball venues

References

External links
Photo Gallery of 2011–2012 Renovations at GWSports.com
Photo Gallery of Final Stages of 2011–2012 Renovations at GWSports.com
16 Page Photo Gallery of Barcroft Park showing the architecture of the new renovated stadium at every angle at Digitalballparks.com.

College baseball venues in the United States
Baseball venues in Virginia
George Washington Colonials baseball
Arlington County, Virginia
Sports venues in the Washington metropolitan area